Acta Biotheoretica: Mathematical and philosophical foundations of biological and biomedical science is a quarterly peer-reviewed scientific journal published by Springer Science+Business Media. It is the official journal of the Jan van der Hoeven Society for Theoretical Biology. The editor-in-chief is F.J.A. Jacobs (Leiden University).

Aims and scope
The journal's focus is theoretical biology which includes mathematical representation, treatment, and modeling for simulations and quantitative descriptions. The journal's focus also includes the philosophy of biology which emphasizes looking at the methods developed to form biological theory. Topical coverage also includes biomathematics, computational biology, genetics, ecology, and morphology.

Abstracting and indexing
This journal is abstracted and indexed in:

According to the Journal Citation Reports, the journal has a 2021 impact factor of 1.185. According to the SCImago Journal Rank (SJR), the journal h-index is 35.

References

Further reading

External links 

Biology journals
Springer Science+Business Media academic journals
Mathematical and theoretical biology
Publications established in 1935
Mathematical and theoretical biology journals
English-language journals